"Ghosts 'n' Stuff" is an electro house song by Canadian electronic music producer Deadmau5 featuring vocals by Australian producer Rob Swire. Its instrumental was released as a single on October 27, 2008, and re-released with vocals on September 27, 2009. The latter was featured on Deadmau5's fourth studio album For Lack of a Better Name.

Background
The original version of "Ghosts 'n' Stuff" was made in 2004, and Joel Zimmerman has stated that it "ended up going through at least 10 revisions". Zimmerman and Rob Swire had been coincidentally meeting each other backstage at various festivals and agreed to collaborate. The vocal melodies performed by Swire were inspired by Chris Isaak's song Wicked Game. The song was made originally specifically for Pete Tong's BBC Radio 1 Essential Selection show on October 10, 2008. Deadmau5 was a guest on the show along with Steve Angello (the two, with Tong, were playing a live set in Manchester, England on that night). Deadmau5 debuted the song to a live audience at the HARD Haunted Mansion 2008 in Los Angeles, California.

The "hard intro" version of one B-side of the single, "Moar Ghosts 'n' Stuff" (which appears on the mixed version of For Lack of a Better Name) features a new intro containing a vocal sample from the 1957 film The Brain from Planet Arous and a quote of the funeral march by Chopin. This version of the track also contains a new lead melody which Deadmau5 has said was inspired by the main melody of Stevie Wonder's Superstition.The unmixed version released on October 20, 2009 replaces this version with the original mix, which excludes the vocal sample and the funeral march intro.

Music video

A music video promoting the single was released in August 2009 and was directed by Colin O'Toole. It was shot in Toronto, Ontario.

The video begins with Joel Zimmerman being rushed into a hospital, before dying within minutes of arrival. He is then revived as a ghost, and attempts to pass through the walls but cannot. He leaves the hospital and wanders around town, getting a tattoo of a Space Invader alien and running into a gang of other ghosts. After an unpleasant trip to a restaurant and a laundromat, Joel attends a rave with several people also dressed in costumes. At the party, someone wearing a Mau5head pulls the white sheet off, as Joel is revived back in the hospital. He finds the Space Invader tattoo which he got as a ghost remaining on his neck.

The music video was uploaded to Ultra Music's YouTube channel on August 19, 2009, and has since acquired over 62 million views.

Release
The song's instrumental was released as a single through Mau5trap and Ultra on October 27, 2008, as a digital download single and 12" vinyl with its B-side "Peddler of Misery". The vocal edit featuring Rob Swire was released as a digital download single and EP on September 27, 2009. Another vinyl version was released in 2009, with the original instrumental mix and "Moar Ghosts 'n' Stuff".

The song peaked at number 12 in the United Kingdom on the UK Singles Chart week beginning October 4, 2009. It also placed at number 96 in the Triple J Hottest 100, 2009. In the United States, "Ghosts 'n' Stuff" received exposure from use in TV shows such as America's Best Dance Crew and heavy radio airplay. In the May 15, 2010 issue of Billboard, the track reached number one on the magazine's Hot Dance Airplay chart after 24 weeks of charting, thus making the single the longest climb to number one ever on the chart, as well as the first single to reach the top spot after it had dropped off, then returned to the chart.

Track listings

Charts

Weekly charts

Year-end charts

Certifications

References

External links
 

2008 singles
2008 songs
Deadmau5 songs
Songs about ghosts
Songs written by Deadmau5
Songs written by Rob Swire
Ultra Music singles